Balian of Ibelin is a name shared by several members of a noble family from the crusader kingdoms of Jerusalem and Cyprus. The most famous was the second lord of Ibelin by that name, whose heavily fictionalised biography was depicted in the 2005 movie Kingdom of Heaven.

Balian of Ibelin may refer to (in chronological order):

Barisan of Ibelin, sometimes known as Balian I or the Elder (died 1150), founder of the Ibelin family
Balian of Ibelin (or Barisan the Younger; c. 1143–1193), 3rd Lord of Ibelin (1170–1193) and protagonist of the 2005 movie Kingdom of Heaven
Balian of Beirut (also Balian III, died 1247), Lord of Beirut (1236–1247)
Balian of Arsuf (1239–1277), Lord of Arsuf (1258–c. 1261)
Balian of Ibelin (1240–1302), seneschal of the crusader kingdom of Cyprus
Balian of Ibelin, Prince of Galilee and Bethlehem, son of Philip of Ibelin (died 1304)

References

See also
Balian (disambiguation)